Western States Sports (also known as the Amarillo Territory) was a professional wrestling promotion headquartered in Amarillo, Texas in the United States. Founded by Dory Detton in 1946, the promotion enjoyed its greatest success in the 1960s and 1970s under the management of Dory Funk and, later, his sons Dory Funk Jr. and Terry Funk, with its top performers including the Funks themselves and Ricky Romero. Western States Sports promoted professional wrestling events in multiple cities across West Texas including Amarillo, Abilene, El Paso, Lubbock, Odessa, and San Angelo, along with Albuquerque in New Mexico, Colorado Springs and Pueblo in Colorado, and the Oklahoma Panhandle. Sold by the Funks in 1980, the promotion closed in 1981.

History 
Western States Sports was founded by Dory Detton in 1946. Detton staged his first show in the Tri-State Fairgrounds on March 14, 1946, marking the first professional wrestling show to be held in Amarillo in over five years. In October 1951, Southwest States Enterprises joined the National Wrestling Alliance.

In 1955, retired wrestler Karl "Doc" Sarpolis purchased Western States Sports from Detton for $75,000.  He offered local wrestler Dory Funk the opportunity to buy-in to the promotion, which he accepted. In addition to booking the promotion, Funk was its biggest star. Sarpolis was elected president of the NWA in 1962.

Funk's sons, Dory Funk Jr. and Terry Funk, began wrestling for the promotion in the mid-1960s. After Sarpolis died in 1967, Funk purchased his shares from his widow, giving him full ownership of Western States Sports. Dory Funk died in 1973, leaving the Funk brothers as owners of the territory.

In the early-1970s, the Funks developed a working relationship with Giant Baba, owner of the All Japan Pro Wrestling promotion. A talent exchange between the two promotions saw Japanese wrestlers such as Genichiro Tenryu and Jumbo Tsuruta debut in Western States Sports before debuting in AJPW.

By 1980, ticket sales were beginning to decline. The Funk brothers sold the territory to wrestlers Blackjack Mulligan and Dick Murdoch for $20,000. With business continuing to slump, the promotion closed in 1981.

Television programming 
Western States Sports aired an hour-long television program on KFDA-TV (Channel 10) each Saturday afternoon. The program aired in West Texas along with New Mexico and Colorado. It was hosted by Steve Stack. The program featured a combination of matches recorded in the KFDA studios in Amarillo, matches recorded at house shows, interviews, and clips of matches from other territories.

Championships

Alumni
 Bob Backlund
 Killer Tim Brooks
 Cyclone Negro
 Ted DiBiase
 Dory Funk
 Dory Funk Jr.
 Terry Funk
 Gory Guerrero
 Swede Hanson
 Rip Hawk
 Gene LeBell
 Wahoo McDaniel
 Sputnik Monroe
 Pedro Morales
 Dick Murdoch
 Thunderbolt Patterson
 Harley Race
 Dusty Rhodes
 Ricky Romero
 Merced Solis
 Dennis Stamp
 Jumbo Tsuruta
 Maurice Vachon
 Bill Watts
 Johnny Weaver

References

External links
 NWA Western States Sports at Wrestling-Titles.com

 
1946 establishments in Texas
1981 disestablishments in Texas
Defunct companies based in Texas
National Wrestling Alliance members
Professional wrestling in Texas